Dan O'Keefe may refer to:

 Dan O'Keefe (writer) (born 1968), television writer and author, popularizer of Festivus on Seinfeld
 Dan O'Keefe (politician), former member of the California State Senate and the Cupertino City Council
 Dan O'Keefe (soccer), retired American soccer forward

See also 
 Daniel O'Keefe (disambiguation)
 Dan O'Keeffe (1907–1967), Irish Gaelic football goalkeeper